Marcgravia comosa is a species of plant native to the Atlantic Forest, in Brazil.

References 

comosa
Fauna of the Atlantic Forest